Soccer (association football) in the Australian Capital Territory (ACT) is predominantly amateur with a local, interstate, national and international history. Football in the ACT is organised and administered by Capital Football and involves teams from within the ACT and surrounding NSW regions, Monaro, Southern Tablelands and Riverina.

National competition

Current
Canberra United FC (CUFC) compete in the elite national women's competition, the A-League Women (formerly known as the W-League). CUFC was established in 2008 by Capital Football and is one of eight founding members of the league. United is the only A-League Women team not affiliated with an A-League Men team.

Since 2014, Canberra, through Capital Football, has been granted one qualification place for the round of 32 of every FFA Cup annual national tournament. The Capital Football Federation Cup is the qualification process for ACT clubs to qualify for the FFA Cup, with the winner of the Cup qualifying. As of 2018, the following ACT teams have qualified and competed in the FFA Cup:

Central Coast Mariners (CCM), in an effort to secure the Canberra region as a catchment for the regional team,  but has moved home A-League fixtures away from their normal stadium in Gosford to Bruce Stadium in Canberra in both 2009 and 2016. During the 2009–10 A-League season, CCM played Perth Glory in September and Adelaide United in October at Bruce Stadium in front of crowds ranging from 5,100 and 5,500. In 2016, CCM entered into an agreement with the ACT Government to play Wellington Phoenix and Adelaide United in Canberra during the 2016–17 season. The Phoenix was chosen due to Canberra and Wellington's sister-city partnership. Adelaide United was chosen as they were the defending champions of the A-league at the time. Both matches were coordinated with Canberra's W-League team, Canberra United, to create double header match-day events.

Previous
Former NSL clubs
Two Canberra clubs have competed in the now defunct National Soccer League (NSL). Canberra City (then known as Canberra Arrows) competed in the NSL between 1977 and 1986 and Canberra Cosmos between 1995 and 2001. The Queanbeyan based Capital Football affiliated club, Inter Monaro (now known as Monaro Panthers) also competed in the NSL between 1985 and 1986. All three clubs shared limited success in the NSL but the Arrows did attract Australian national team legend Johnny Warren as manager of the club during this period as well as giving then future Socceroo and national team manager Frank Farina his first senior football debut. The Cosmos attracted the Australian national team captain at the time, Paul Wade, when they joined the NSL as well as nurturing a number of future Socceroos including Jason Polak, Robbie Hooker, John Markovski, Nik Mrdja, Lindsay Wilson and Vince Grella. The Cosmos were also led by Sport Australia Hall of Famer and former national team manager, Rale Rasic for two seasons.

Former Women's NSL clubs
The Canberra Eclipse competed in the Women's National Soccer League from formation in 1996 till folding in 2004.  The team played home matches out of West Belconnen Leagues Club and the AIS in Belconnen. Similar to the other five teams in the national competition, the Eclipse had an alternative name, the ACT Academy of Sports. The Canberra Eclipse won the league in 2001–02, beating NSW Sapphires 1–0 in the grand final. Canberra also finished runner-up in 1998–99 when the Eclipse lost 0–2 to SASI Pirates. Australian internationals, Lisa Casagrande and Caitlin Munoz both won league Golden Boots in 98–99 and 01-02 respectively in Eclipse jerseys.  Other Australian internationals to represent the Eclipse include Ellie Brush and Amy Taylor.

Failed A-League4Canberra bid
In July 2008 TransACT CEO, Ivan Slavich, formally established the A-League4Canberra bid organisation along with other key local business identities. The organisations goal was to obtain an A-league licence for the Canberra region. The A-League4Canberra bid officially launched 11 December 2008 at Jerrabomberra Primary School, headed by Ivan Slavich alongside Canberra United player Ellie Brush and Member for Eden-Monaro, Mike Kelly. A-League4Canberra quickly secured ACT Government support for their bid in 2009 with the ACT Labor Government committing $2.5 million towards the bid. Former Canberra-born Australian internationals, Ned Zelic and Carl Valeri signed on to become founding members and spokespeople of the organisation. The bid signed 2000 members, raising $5 million as it gathered capital to meet FFA bid criteria. In 2009 and 2011 Canberra's bid was overlooked by FFA in its initial rounds of league expansion in favour of now defunct North Queensland Fury, Gold Coast United and Sydney Rovers. When the Sydney Rovers bid collapsed the A-League4Canberra organisation again submitted a bid for inclusion in the league, however the FFA again overlooked the bid in favour of establishing its own team in Western Sydney that would become Western Sydney Wanderers. On 10 May 2012, after its failed attempts and FFA's announcement that expansion beyond ten teams was on hold for the foreseeable future, the A-League4Canberra bid organisation's CEO, Heather Reid, announced the organisation would cease efforts to gain an A-league licence for the Canberra region, would wind-up operations and refund founding members monies.

Local competition
Capital Football operates and administers all local competitions in the ACT for senior men and women and junior girls and boys.

Junior
The ACT breaks its junior structure and league system up into Miniroo (formally Rooball) for early development and junior league football for teenagers. The junior elite pathway comes under the banner of the NPL.
 Miniroo is for Under 5/6 to Under 12s age groups, the football is non-competitive and focused on player development
 Boys Junior Leagues is for boys between the ages of 13–17 years, with division 1–3 in most age groups
 Girls Junior Leagues is for girls between the ages of 13–17 years, with divisions 1–2 in most age groups
 NPL elite pathways for both boys and girls in age groups u13, u14, u16 and u18

Senior

History
The first senior football match played in the ACT was played in 1910 between Ginninderra and Yarralumla. The match was played at the Ginninderra showgrounds and came about because Ginninderra locals wanted to play a different sport from the already established Rugby Union. The visiting Yarralumla team won the match 1–0.

League system
The ACT senior men's competitions are generally run between April and September each calendar year.  The league system is amateur in nature with a few semi-professional exceptions. The system consists of a pyramid of leagues, headed by three single divisions that do not encompass promotion and relegation, instead league licences to compete are granted by Capital Football. However, divisions 1–6 are bound together by the principle of promotion and relegation. The most successful club in each league rises to a higher league, whilst the club that finishes at the bottom of their league finds itself sinking down a level. Division 7–10 are open leagues for casual/social players. All leagues contest a regular season and conclude with a finals series.

The ACT senior women's competitions are generally run parallel to the men's with the competition running between April to September each calendar year. The league system is amateur in nature. The system consists of a pyramid of six leagues that do not encompass promotion and relegation, instead league licences to compete are granted by Capital Football. All leagues contest a regular season and conclude with a finals series.

Leagues structure
The ACT men's league structure is broken into thirteen league levels, at the top is the single division of National Premier Leagues Capital Football (Level 1, which is often referred to as the “top flight”), containing ten teams, of which, as of 2017, seven are based in Canberra, Australian Capital Territory, with the final three based in the New South Wales towns of Queanbeyan, Cooma and Griffith. One of the teams, FFA Centre of Excellence, is an age restricted youth academy, which is ineligible for the finals series. Below The NPL is the Capital Football State League structure of twelve leagues (Levels 2 to 13). The Capital League (Level 2) and The Capital League Reserves (Level 3) both contain eight teams each. State League Division 1–6 (Level 4–9) are competitive divisions that are restricted to ten teams but may sometimes contain less than ten teams. Divisions 7–10 (Level 10–13) have no limits on competing teams and are open for inclusion submissions.

The ACT women's league structure is broken into six league levels, at the top is the single division of Women's National Premier League Capital Football (Level 1, which is often referred to as the “top flight”), containing eight teams, of which, as of 2017, seven are based in Canberra, ACT and one based in Queanbeyan, NSW. Below the NPL is The ACT State League women's structure. This structure is broken into five leagues, at the top of the system is Division 1 (Level 2, sometimes referred to as Women's Capital League), containing 9 clubs, of which, as of 2016, eight are based in Canberra, Australian Capital Territory and one is based in Goulburn, NSW. Divisions 2 to 5 (Level 3–6) contain between 8 and 10 teams each with thirty-four clubs coming from Canberra and two coming from NSW, Queanbeyan and Yass.

Cup competition
The ACT Federation Cup (Fed Cup) has been in existence since 1962 under various sponsorship names. Currently the cup is named the Capital Football Federation Cup. As of 2016, the Fed Cup uses a nineteen team bracket broken up into five rounds (Round 1, Round 2, quarter-finals, semi-finals, Final). Round 1 consists of six qualifier teams, predominantly State League Division 1 teams, competing in three matches with three teams advancing. Round two sees thirteen clubs enter from the NPL Capital Football and Capital League (Level 1 and 2) and join the three qualified teams. Since 2014, the cup has been used by Capital Football as the qualifying tournament for FFA Cup qualification with the final winner qualifying for the FFA Cup round of 32. The Cup has been awarded every year since 1962 with one exception, 1973. In 1973, the Cup final between Croatia Deakin and Juventus was abandoned by the match officials after twenty minutes with the score locked at nill-nill due to crowd trouble. The match was not replayed and the cup not awarded. The most successful club in the Cup's history is Canberra FC, who under its various different names has lifted the cup seventeen times.

The ACT Women's Federation Cup is run as a pre-season cup competition that is open to all teams of all levels. From 2015, the cup has consisted of a group stage followed by a grand final. Prior to that, it consisted of a group stage with two pools and then a grand final of the two pool winners.

Futsal
ACT Futsal consists of an elite level women's and men's league (referred to as the Premier League) plus five men's divisions broken into regions, three women's divisions and two mixed divisions. League seasons are run during the spring and summer months with the premier leagues running from September to December each calendar year. All leagues contest a regular season and conclude with a finals series. As of 2017, there are 5,000 registered futsal players in the ACT.

International events
The ACT hosts an annual international youth tournament named the Kanga Cup. The tournament is organised and run by Capital Football and attracts participants from all over the globe.  Matches are played at selected ACT playing districts across Canberra over a two-week period in July.

History of Matches

2000 Olympics
Canberra's Bruce Stadium was selected as a host venue for men's and women's football for the 2000 Sydney Olympics. The ACT hosted five men's and women's group matches at Bruce Stadium between 13 September and 20 September 2000 including the Australian women's national football team (the Matildas). Bruce also hosted one of the women's semi-finals on 24 September 2000.

2003 OFC Women's Championship
The 2003 OFC Women's Championship was hosted at McKellar Park between 5 – 13 April 2003. Five nations contested the championship including Australia, New Zealand, Papua New Guinea, Samoa and Cook Islands. The championship doubled as the OFC Women's World Cup Qualifying Tournament for the 2003 FIFA Women's World Cup held in the US.

2015 Asian Cup
Canberra was selected as one of five host cities for the 2015 Asian Cup Finals. Bruce Stadium was selected as the host venue in Canberra with McKellar Park and Deakin Stadium selection as training venues. Gungahlin Enclosed was selected as a back-up training venue in case one of the other two become unavailable. Iraq, North Korea and Qatar all used Canberra has their tournament base while Kuwait based themselves in Queanbeyan just over the border in NSW. Bruce Stadium played host to six group stage matches and one quarter-final match. One AFC representative labelled the Canberra playing surface as the best of the tournament while tickets sales for Canberra doubled budgeted expectations.

Australian National Men's Team matches

The Australian men's national team (the Socceroos) has played in the ACT five times with the first match in 1996 against Tahiti in the second leg of the 1996 OFC Nations Cup Final. In 2015, off the back of Canberrra successful 2015 Asian Cup hosting, the nations capital secured a World Cup qualifier for the first time. The Australian national team played Kyrgyzstan in a 2018 World Cup qualifier in the second round of AFC qualifications. In 2019, it was announced the Australian men's national team would return to Canberra for the first time in four years with another world cup qualifier. Australia would come up against Napal in an AFC 2022 World Cup qualifier.

Australian National Women's Team matches

The Australia women's national team (the Matildas) has a long history of playing matches in the ACT. In total the Matildas have played 17 matches in Canberra. The first match against New Zealand was played on 17 March 1995 in an international friendly. The Matildas have been involved in two major FIFA sanctioned tournaments in the ACT. Australia played one group match of the 2000 Olympic Games at Bruce Stadium against Germany. In 2003, McKellar Park played host to the 2003 OFC Women's Championship, Australia went on to win the tournament. In 2019, FFA and the ACT Government announced a deal to bring the Australia women's national team back to Canberra for the first time in six years.

Interstate competition

Inter-connection with NSW clubs and competitions

During the history of football in the ACT there has been frequent inter-connection with NSW. The following points detail this connection history:

 1924, ACT Scottish community club, Burns Club, established Burns Football Club, which toured around country NSW and Sydney, playing matches over a two-year period.
 1931, with the Great Depression gripping the ACT and the nation, the Federal Capital Territory Soccer Football Association and its five member clubs ceased competition with the only football in the capital territory being played between Canberra and cross-border rivals Queanbeyan.
 1934, following the collapse of the Federal Monaro District Soccer Association and the football league in the ACT, the only club to remain was NSW based Gundaroo (formed 1933). Gundaroo took on the leftover Canberra players and contested matches against Goulburn and Marulan.
 End of the 1940s, World War II stopped all but travelling serviceman football matches in the ACT until a team called Wanderers was formed and contested matches in Goulburn and Sydney. The team attracted strong crowds and was the catalyst for re-developing the game in Canberra.
 1950's, new Canberra based clubs started to be established on the back of new post-war migrant communities in the ACT, by 1954 these clubs including Roma, Olympic, Hungaria and Croatia were attracting strong crowds of 2,000 people and were also competing in the Sydney-based Robertson Cup.
 1960's, the newly established ACT Soccer Association looked to expand the ACT football league by inviting NSW sides from surrounding Wagga, Griffith and Queanbeyan (Inter Monaro and Makedonia) regions. 
 1978, ACT Premier League club, Inter Monaro, then ACT champions and premieres, switched from the ACT Premier League to NSW. The Queanbeyan-based club competed in the NSW top flight between 1978 till 1985 and again between 1987 till 1990 with a two-year gap in the middle spent in the NSL. Monaro won the NSW Division One premiership in 1984 and the finals series championship in 1979.
 1987, after losing its NSL spot post the restructure, Canberra City rebranded as Canberra City Griffins and spent one season in the NSW Premier League where it finished runner-up in the league to Wollongong City by two points while the club also lost the finals series grand final to the same opposition 1–2. Canberra City then withdrew from the league and moved to the ACT Premier League from 1988 onward.
 1988, Croatia Deakin left the ACT Premier League to compete in the NSW Premier League under the name Canberra Croatia. Canberra Croatia would compete in the NSW Premier League for seven years before returning to the ACT Premier League in 1995. During this time Canberra Croatia won the Waratah Cup in 1990, lost the cup final in 1992, finished league runner-up in 1989 and 1990 and lost three consecutive league grand-finals between 1989 and 1991.
 2000, Belconnen United switched to the NSW Premier League from the ACT Premier League and the club was renamed Belconnen Blue Devils. Belconnen competed in NSW for five seasons. The Blue Devils enjoyed success in NSW, claiming the league premiership in 2003–04 and the challenger league winners’ medal in 2004–05. A dispute with the management of Football NSW in 2006 saw the club's licence revoked and the club return to the ACT Premier League.
 Currently, Capital Football has eight NSW based member clubs from the Monaro, Southern Tablelands and Riverina regions. The latest of these, Griffith based Riverina Rhinos, joined the NPL Capital Football in 2017.

Sydney FC A-League Pre-Season Cup matches in Canberra

During the 2006–07 and 2007–08 A-League seasons, Sydney FC played two Pre-Season Cup matches at Bruce Stadium in Canberra.

A-league club friendlies in Canberra

Since the A-League inception in 2005 a number of interstate A-League teams have travelled to Canberra to conduct training camps, youth coaching clinics and play pre-season trial matches against local ACT clubs and representative teams. A-League teams to have travelled to Canberra include Sydney FC, Central Coast Mariners, Newcastle United Jets and Western Sydney Wanderers. ACT clubs to compete in these interstate friendlies include Belconnen United, Canberra FC, Gungahlin United and Canberra Olympic.

ACT interstate A-League partnerships

In 2007, Belconnen United signed a mutual benefiting relationship agreement with A-League club Central Coast Mariners. The two clubs agreed to play an annual pre-season friendly match in Canberra at McKellar Park named The Bank of Queensland Cup. The agreement opened up opportunities for a development pathway for ACT talent to the A-League while the Mariners gained a foothold within the ACT footballing community.  The agreement lasted five years with annual matches played between 2007 and 2011, starting with a 4–0 victory to the visiting Mariners on 30 June 2007.

10 April 2015, Belconnen United announced they had formed a formal relationship with A-League heavyweights Sydney FC. The agreement between the two clubs established a formal pathway for Belconnen youngsters to progress and gain the possibility of an A-League contract with Sydney FC. The agreement also opened up ongoing opportunities for Belconnen coaching staff to work with and information share with Sydney FC staff including Graham Arnold. Finally, Sydney FC agreed to tour Canberra in 2015 pre-season to host coaching clinics and play a friendly match against the Blue Devils. Belconnen lost the friendly match against Sydney 0–3 with second half goals to Andrew Hoole, Jacob Tratt and Matt Simon in front of 1,852 fans.

ACT interstate NPL partnerships

2 January 2017, Belconnen United entered into a mutual benefiting agreement with NSW NPL club Wollongong Wolves to co-host a "festival of football" in the South Coast town of Nowra. 28–29 January 2017, the two clubs played a number of women's and men's junior and senior exhibition matches, ran free all-ages coaching and refereeing clinics, training drills, player sessions and family activities at Nowra's Ison Park.

Academies
FFA Centre of Excellence (formally Australian Institute of Sport Football Program) – Established in 1981 as one of the eight founding programs at the Australian Institute of Sport. The FFA Centre of Excellence (FFA COE) is run by the national federation of Australia and is based in Bruce, Australian Capital Territory. Funding for the program is provided by the federal Australian Sports Commission. 20 students from all over Australia between the ages 14–17 are selected for a 12-month study and development program, with the option of a second year. The FFA COE fields their squad in the top division of men's football in the ACT, NPL Capital Football but is ineligible for the Federation Cup and league finals series. The program has previously competed in the NSW and Victorian Premier Leagues and has produced a host of Australian international players.

 

Canberra United Academy (CUA) – Established on 15 December 2015 by Capital Football, the CUA was an amalgamation of Capital Football's various elite high performance football programs into one entity. CUA is the elite academy for both boys and girls from the ACT and surrounding regions between the ages of 10 and 17. In 2016 the academy fielded their boys squad in the NPL Capital Football but its inclusion was controversial with ACT NPL clubs threatening to form their own breakaway league or boycotting matches at one stage before negotiations with Capital Football avoided that scenario and a compromise was reached for 2017 onwards that would see the boys CUA merge with the FFA COE, with two players selected from CUA to be included in the FFA COE squad. CUA has fielded their girls program in the Women's National Premier League Capital Football since 2016 onwards.

Motivate Football Academy Australia (MFAA) – Established 2013, the MFAA is a private academy based in Canberra. The academy focuses in individual skills, technique and confidence not game tactics and formations.

ACT football association names

Stadiums and grounds

Representative
ACT representative teams often compete at national junior level competitions and tournaments. ACT representative teams play in yellow, blue and white colours, representing the colours of the ACT found on the Territory's flag. Since 2008 there have been a number of different incarnations of an ACT top flight select XI who has played visiting teams, predominantly visiting A-League teams. This select XI has been named ACT Rockets, Canberra Rockets, Capital Football Select, ACT NPL All-Stars and Capital North/South Region Select. These teams have versed Central Coast Mariners (2008, 2009, 2016) and Newcastle United Jets (2012, 2013) at ACT venues including the Australian Institute of Sport, McKellar Park, Deakin Stadium and Woden Park.

See also

Sport in the Australian Capital Territory

References

External links
Capital Football website
Football Federation Australia website
Canberra United website
W-League website
NPL Capital Football website

 
Australian Capital Territory
Soccer in Canberra